The London Borough of Hounslow is a peripheral London borough in the south-west of the conurbation; as such part of the Metropolitan Green Belt lies within its boundaries. It has one of London's largest Nature reserves as well as many smaller gardens and sports grounds. The major areas are:

 Bedfont Lakes Country Park, near Heathrow Airport: created 1995
Blenheim Park, Feltham
 Boston Manor Park & Nature Reserve, a historic park which includes the 17th century Boston Manor House. Purchased 1923 by Hounslow Council. It has an ornamental lake with waterfowl, 3 tennis courts, a modern well equipped children's  play area and cafeteria. Open 8am till dusk.
 Chiswick Common
Chiswick House Grounds, historic landscape gardens
Crane Park, 6 miles (10 km) linear riverside park
Cranford Park
Dukes Meadows, a riverside park in Chiswick, which includes a play area, sports clubs and a health and fitness centre.
Feltham Park
Gunnersbury Park Estate, which includes Gunnersbury Park House, now a museum
Hanworth Park, or London Air Park, a former airfield converted into a green open space
Hounslow Heath, a Local Nature Reserve
Inwood Park, Hounslow
Hounslow Urban Farm, a rare breeds centre and London's largest community farm
Lampton Park, one of the largest green areas and public parks in West London
Osterley Park, a National Trust property
 Redlees Park, Isleworth
Syon House, residence of the Duke of Northumberland
 Turnham Green

See also
 Hounslow

Notes

External links
 Hounslow parks and open spaces

 
City farms in London